Vankino is a rural locality (a village) in Pereborskoye Rural Settlement, Beryozovsky District, Perm Krai, Russia. The population was 289 as of 2010. There are 7 streets.

Geography 
Vankino is located on the Shakva River, 26 km north of  Beryozovka (the district's administrative centre) by road. Yermolino is the nearest rural locality.

References 

Rural localities in Beryozovsky District, Perm Krai